Khidr Bey or Khidr Beg, was an Ottoman Hanafi-Maturidi scholar and poet of the 9th/15th century, and the first kadi (qadi) of Istanbul. The unique source for his biography is the Arabic original of al-Shaqa'iq al-Nu'maniyya by Tash-Kopru-Zade.

Biography 
He was born in Sivrihisar, where his father, Jalal al-Din, was kadi — though the fact that the latter was, also. He completed his studies in Bursa under the famous scholar Molla Yegan, whose daughter he married, and is then said to have returned to Sivrihisar as a teacher. He acquired such a reputation for learning that he was appointed to the madrasa of Mehmed I in Bursa with an increase in stipend, and certain of his pupils here were subsequently to become scholars of great eminence. Next he taught at the madrasa of Bayezid I in Bursa, again with an increased stipend, and in addition was appointed kadi of İnegöl. From here he moved to the newest of the two madrasas in the Üç Şerefeli Mosque in Edirne, and thence to Yanbolu (in present-day Bulgaria) as kadi.

His three sons, Ya'kub Pasha, Mufti Ahmad Pasha and Sinan Pasha, were also notable scholars, the latter being the author of the famous Tadarru'dt.

Death 
After the conquest of Istanbul in 857/1453, he was appointed its first kadi, in which post he remained until his death in 863/1458-9. He is buried in the Zeyrek quarter of Istanbul, where he also built the mosque later attributed to a certain Hadjdji Kadin.

He was buried next to the tomb of Abu Ayyub al-Ansari (Eyüp Cemetery), the companion of the Prophet Muhammad who died during the First Arab Siege of Constantinople (674–678 CE).

Works 
Although Khidr Beg is reputed to have introduced the versified chronogram into Ottoman literature, very few of his Turkish poems have survived and his reputation rests on three poems in Arabic.

The first, a didactic qasida in the basit metre on the creed, is known as the Nuniyya and has been the subject of several commentaries, most notably that by his pupil al-Khayali.

Another qasida, also a Nuniyya, also called Jawahir al-'Aqa'id, dealing with the creed, but in the wafir metre, is usually known as 'Ujalat layla aw laylatayn, is paid special attention in Ottoman period by writing many commentaries.

Finally, there is a Mustazad, in a Persian variety of the hazadj metre, which was greatly admired and attracted imitations for over a century. Bursall Mehmed Tahir mentions a translation into Persian of the Mafdli' which he made at the request of Sultan Mehmed II the Conqueror, the work in question probably being the Matali' al-Anwar, on logic, by Siraj al-Din al-Urmawi (d. 1283).

See also 

 Abu Hanifa
 Abu Mansur al-Maturidi
 Shams al-Din al-Fanari
 Sa'd al-Din al-Taftazani
 Al-Sharif al-Jurjani
 Akmal al-Din al-Babarti
 Ibn Kemal
 Ebussuud Efendi
 Muhammad Zahid al-Kawthari
 Muhammed Hamdi Yazır
 Abd al-Ghani al-Nabulsi
 Shah Waliullah Dehlawi
 Abd al-Hayy al-Lucknawi
 List of Ash'aris and Maturidis
 List of Muslim theologians

Notes

References

External links
 Cawahir al-'Akaid of Hızır Bey
 Hızır Çelebi (Hızır Bey) 
 Hızır Çelebi (Hızır Bey) 

Hanafis
Maturidis
15th-century Muslim theologians
Muslims from the Ottoman Empire
Philosophers from the Ottoman Empire
Turkish philosophers
Turkish logicians
Turkish Sunni Muslim scholars of Islam
Turkish legal scholars
Turkish jurists
Turkish poets
People from Sivrihisar
Sunni imams
Sunni fiqh scholars
Sunni Muslim scholars of Islam
Sharia judges
Jurists from the Ottoman Empire
Mehmed the Conqueror
1407 births
1456 deaths
1458 deaths
1459 deaths